The Women's club throw athletics events for the 2020 Summer Paralympics took place at the Tokyo National Stadium on August 27 and September 3, 2021. A total of 2 events were contested in this discipline.

Schedule

Medal summary
The following is a summary of the medals awarded across all club throw events.

Results

F32
Records

Prior to this competition, the existing world, Paralympic, and area records were as follows:

Results

The final in this classification took place on 27 August 2021, at 19:10:

F51
Records

Prior to this competition, the existing world, Paralympic, and area records were as follows:

Results

The final in this classification took place on 3 September 2021, at 19:05:

References

Athletics at the 2020 Summer Paralympics
2021 in women's athletics